Wat Lam Phaya Floating Market (also called as Lam Phaya Floating Market) is a floating market located in front of Lam Phaya temple, on the Tha Chin River. 

It was built by the Lam Phaya Cultural District Council, and takes its name form the nearby Lam Phaya Temple. The purpose of this market is to support the community for traditional people to sale their product like hand-made, vegetables, fruits and cloths. In the market, many locals set up their merchandise on boats, and also in booths along the walkway. Most of the food is traditional Thai food to represent and express how traditional people live. For example; Chicken Biryani, the grilled-chicken with the mixing of rice, herb and spice. Also, Thai vermicelli, a boiled fish noodle mixed curry spices, etc. There are also places where tourists can join the fishing activity in front of the Lam Phaya temple.

History 
Lam Phaya Floating Market is located on the Lam playa, Banglane, Nakornphratom province. “Lam Phaya” is the name of the village when they are still Bangpla, Nakornchaisri province. In the King Rama 5th period, there was an event that Phraya Kromta canalized the back of the market for the farmer to do agriculture. This area was separated into two groups Mon people, who originally came from Samkork in the period of King Rama III (1824 - 1851). They settled down at the west of the river doing agriculture. Secondly, the Chinese that settled down at the east of the river to do trading. After that, Lam Phaya developed the community to be more famous to increase the income of Lam Phaya people.

Places in the Community 

According to the Urban planning of the town which is very small, It give the idea that each place were influenced by name of the place near by.

Wat Lam Phaya (Lam Phaya Temple) 

The temple is the place where Luang Por Mongkol Buddha Mala is located. The statue is made of laterite covered with cement and gold leaf. It was enshrined since the year 2400 BCE for people to worship to bless for the auspicious occasion before shopping in the  Lam Phaya Floating Market which is not far away.

Architecture of Temple 

Except from the Floating Market, the temple also has the interesting architectural to investigate. Luang Por Mongkol Buddha Mala Statue in the temple is sacred respectable to the Lam Phaya village. The Chapel has 6 doors for the entrance and exit. It is made of the concrete also facing the “Tha Chin River” which made it different from other chapels which usually face in the East. The area of the river is regarded as the park of fish. The reason for that is because there are tons of fish that live up there hunting for food. It has become the interesting activities that most tourist like to enjoy.

Lam Phaya Temple Folk Floating Market Museum 
The museum was built to exhibit the lifestyle of folk people who live in the community as a community of cultural integration. It was opened in 2000 with the construction of a Thai house made of wood. There are two floor in the museum. The first floor displays some agriculture tools and the community folk boats. Walking through the second floor displays many artisan items (pottery, sculpture) which were made and used by people. It is the place where they collect things like an evidence from period to period which explained how the community glow. Most of them were given by people who live in the community.

Neighbourhoods

Rattiya City
Rattiya City is a retro themed attractions and contemporary markets on Tha Chin river that simulates the walls of the Ayutthaya kingdom. It is only  from the floating market. This place used to be used as a filming location for many historical movies or TV series such as Sri Ayodhaya on TrueVisions and True4U etc.

The Happy Nest
Ban Rang Nok or internationally known as The Happy Nest is will be before Rattiya City if coming from Wat Lam Phaya floating market. It is a chic café and eatery on the Tha Chin river that operates on the theme of saving the planet and environmentally friendly as well as a community flea market that sells organic, non-toxic products.

How to Get There
Getting there by local pickup truck taxi (route Salaya-Rattiya City) from bus station in front of Mahidol University, Salaya (catty-corner from entrance of Salaya railway station) fare 19 baht per person.

References

External links
Wat Lam Phaya Floating Market ตลาดน้ำวัดลำพญา. (2016, January 17). Retrieved February 23, 2017

“ตลาดน้ำลำพญา” จ.นครปฐม แหล่งรวมของอร่อย ชอปเพลิน เดินเที่ยวสนุก (2016, July 22). Retrieved February 23, 2017

Luekens, D. (n.d.). Lam Phaya Floating Market, Nakhon Pathom / Bangkok. Retrieved February 23, 2017

Lumphaya Floating Market (2014, April). Retrieved February 23, 2017

ฐานข้อมูลพิพิธภัณฑ์ในประเทศไทย Thai Museums Database. (2012, February 10). Retrieved February 23, 2017

Barrow, R. (2011, December 23). Wat Lampaya Floating Market Retrieved February 23, 2017

สถานที่ท่องเที่ยว : Wat Lam Phaya Floating Market. (n.d.). Retrieved February 23, 2017

Tourist attractions in Nakhon Pathom province
Floating markets in Thailand